The Industrial Design Excellence Awards is a program sponsored by BusinessWeek and the Industrial Designers Society of America ("IDSA").
These are the awards which were given out for 2006.

Return to main article:Industrial Design Excellence Awards

Business & Industrial Products

Gold Winners
ResQTec hydraulic rescue tools (Credit:VanBerloStudio's B.V., Netherlands)

Silver Winners
Crown TSP6000 Turret Stockpicker (Credit:Crown Equipment Corp., Formation Design Group, Ergonomic Systems Design, Inc., Substance Design Group Ltd., and Design Central, USA)
Crinia (Credit:Design + Industry Pty Limited, Australia)
Surveillance Dome Camera WV-CS954 (Credit:Panasonic Design Company, Japan)
Pocket Imager (SP-P300MK) (Credit:Samsung Electronics, Korea)

Bronze Winners
CT-80 Explosive Detection System (Credit:Martin Steven Linder Design, USA)
Memory Card Camera-Recorder DVC PRO HD P2 Handheld AG-HVX200 (Credit:Panasonic Design Company, Japan)
The Jobclock (Credit:Stuart Karten Design, USA)

Computer Equipment

Gold Winners
Talking Tactile Tablet (TTT) (Credit:Touch Graphics, Inc., USA)
Lenovo Opti Desktop PC (Credit:ZIBA Design, Inc. and Lenovo Group Limited, China)

Silver Winners
Laptop Mobility Cart (Credit:Bretford, USA)
SanDisk Ultra II SD PLUS (Credit:Lunar Design and SanDisk, USA)
AMD Personal Internet Communicator (PIC) (Credit:M3 Design, USA)
DX1 Input System (Credit:Summit ID and Productiv, USA)

Consumer Products

Gold Winners
SignalOne Safety Vocal Smoke Detector (VSD) (Credit:Bresslergroup and SignalOne Safety f/k/a Kidsmart, USA)
2SECONDS QUECHUA (Credit:DECATHLON, France)
DXL Protective Helmet (Credit:fuseproject, Pulsium Engineering, and Pryde Group, USA)
Wall Mounted Digital Projector (AN110) (Credit:LG Electronics Inc., Korea)
Washing and Drying Machine NA-VR1000 (Credit:Panasonic Design Company, Japan)
Eva Solo Tea-maker (Credit:Tools Design, Denmark)
Little Wing (Credit:Warren Light Craft LLC, USA)

Silver Winners
L'Amour collection (Credit:Nokia Design, Great Britain, Nokia Design, Finland, and Nokia Design, USA)
A/Design Bowl (Credit:designafairs and Fielitz GmbH Leichtbauelemente, Germany)
Shure E4 Sound Isolation Earphones (Credit:Essential Inc. and Shure Inc., USA)
K2 Moxie Snow Helmet (Credit:One & Co, City Electric, and K2 Corporation, USA)
Refrigerator NR-P550T (Credit:Panasonic Design Company, USA)
HDR-HC1 (Credit:Sony Corporation, Japan)
Timberland PreciseFit System (Credit:The Timberland Company, USA)
Solo (Credit:asa designers limited and Arcam Limited, Great Britain)

Bronze Winners
The BikeBoard Product Line (Credit:Davison, Inc. and The BikeBoard Company, LLC, USA)
X-BASE TRIBORD (Credit:Decathlon, France)
Oval Light Dispenser Flashlight (Credit:Gelb Design, FLLC, USA)
Kenjo Ryoko (Credit:Karim Rashid Inc., USA)
KARI, ARI, ARIM, RIM (Credit:Karim Rashid Inc., USA)
Mion Footwear (Credit:Keen Design Studio and Timberland Invention Factory, USA)
WaterTile (Credit:Kohler Co., USA)
Sushi Time Sushi Plate (Credit:Mint Inc., USA)
Motorola and Burton Audex Jacket Series (Credit:Mobile Device Business, Motorola, USA)
Cupsicle 8oz. Insulated My First Straw Cup (Credit:Munchkin, Inc., USA)
Battery Size-Free Flash Light BF-104 (Credit:Panasonic Design Company, Japan)
Household Fuel Cell Cogeneration System (Credit:Panasonic Dseign Company, Japan)
O3 Engineered Tennis Racquets (Credit:Prince Sports srl, Italy)

Design Explorations

Gold Winners
Touch Messenger (Credit:Samsung Design China, Korea, Samsung Design China, China, Samsung Design China, USA)
Intelligent Energy ENV Bike (Credit:Seymourpowell and Intelligent Energy, Great Britain)

Silver Winners
BRP EXIT Concept (Credit:BRP Design Team, Canada)
Chrysler AKINO (Credit:DaimlerChryslerPacifica, USA)
The Hover Creeper (Credit:Davison Design & Development, Inc. and Whiteside Manufacturing Company, Inc., USA)
Hundred Dollar Laptop Computer (Credit:Design Continuum, USA)
Safe-Vent Syringe Venting System (Credit:Formation Design Group, USA)
Samsung Portable Digital Projector (Credit:Teague and Samsung Electronics, USA)

Bronze Winners
Nutty Buddy (Credit:Arizona State University, USA)
Home Cinema II (Credit:Hewlett Packard and Pix Interactive, USA)
Accuray Next Generation CyberKnife Concept Investigation with Robotic Patient Positioner Couch (RPPC) (Credit:Lunar Design and Accuray, USA)
Cocoon - disaster relief shelters (Credit:NewDealDesign, USA)
Bumpbrella Concept Umbrella (Credit:RKS Design, USA)
Luna: Light + Air Door (Credit:, LLC, USA)
Ondomusic (Credit:Ondo Creation Limited, Hong Kong)

Design Strategy

Gold Winners
Sirius S-50 Design Strategy (Credit:ZIBA Design, Inc. and Sirius Satellite Radio)

Bronze Winners
South Waterfront Design Strategy (Credit:Gerding Edlen Development Company, LLC, Williams & Dame Development, ZIBA Design, Inc., Val Taylor Smith and Randy Poulsen, USA)
Netgear Platinum II design language (Credit:NewDealDesign, USA)

Ecodesign

Gold Winners
SIM from Tricycle (Credit:Tricycle Inc., USA)

Silver Winners
Zody (Credit:Haworth Inc. and ITO - Design, USA)

Bronze Winners
Celle Task Chair (Credit:Jerome Caruso Design, USA)
Mion Footwear (Credit:Keen Design Studio and Timberland Invention Factory, USA)

Environments

Gold Winners
Construction Fence (Credit:DUCK IMAGE CO., LTD., USA)
Ashes and Snow - The Nomadic Museum (Credit:Gensler, Shigeru Ban Architects, France, and Officina Di Architettura, Italy)
Bloomberg L.P. Corporate Headquarters (Credit:Pentagram Design, USA)

Silver Winners
Voyage + mini Voyage (Credit:fuseproject and Hammers Nagel Engineering, Germany)
[Marmol Radziner Prefab] (Credit:Marmol Radziner + Associates, Green Dragon Office, Tryarc LLC, Greg Steinberg and Robin Cottle Design, USA)

Bronze Winners
Outdoor Information Carts (Credit:34th Street Partnership)
Help Point Intercom (Credit:Antenna Design New York Inc. and MTA/New York City Transit Team, USA)
Nosy Parker (Credit:Antenna Design New York Inc., USA)

Furniture

Gold Winners
THINK (Credit:Glen Oliver Loew Industrial Design, Germany, and Steelcase Inc., USA)
CityWing (Credit:Philips Design, Netherlands)

Silver Winners
Duo shower curtain rod (Credit:Robyn Kaminski, IDSA, USA)
COCOON (Credit:UONO, Germany)

Bronze Winners
Belkin/Ameriwood Grommet Hub (Credit:Belkin IDG and Ameriwood Industries, USA)

Medical & Scientific Products

Gold Winners
Cybertech MAT Mechanical Advantage Tourniquet (Credit:Cybertech Medical and Ewing Design Group, USA)
Insulet Omnipod Personal Diabetes Management System (Credit:Design Continuum, USA)
Siemens Symbia Medical Imaging Systems (Credit:Siemens Medical Systems, Formation Design Group, Germany, and Ergonomic Systems Design, USA)

Silver Winners
SuturTek 360° Fascia Closure Device (Credit:Bleck Design Group and SuturTek, USA)
Smiths Cleo 90 Infusion Set (Credit:Bridge Design and Smiths Medical MD, Inc, USA)
Echelon60 ENDOPATH (Credit:Stapler Ethicon Endo-Surgery and Design Science, USA)
3D Mouse (Credit:GE Healthcare, USA)
At Home Neuromotor Test Device (Credit:Intel Corporation, USA)
Quantum Design SVSM (Credit:Strategix Vision Inc., USA)

Bronze Winners
FirstDefender Handheld Raman Spectrometer (Credit:Altitude, Inc, USA)
Titan Electron Microscope (Credit:Philips Design, Netherlands)
da Vinci S - Surgical System (Credit:, USA)
SonoSite MicroMaxx Ultrasound System (Credit:SonoSite, USA)

Packaging & Graphics

Gold Winners
Pluma (Credit:Brandia Central, Portugal)

Silver Winners
Cepheid Reagent Beads Dispenser (Credit: and Cepheid Inc., USA)

Research

Gold Winners
Lenovo Visioneering (Credit:ZIBA Design, Inc. and Lenovo Group Limited, China)

Silver Winners
Time Empowerment Research (Credit:Stuart Karten Design, USA)

Student Designs

Gold Winners
The MIN.CHAIR (Credit:Chul Min Kang, USA)
CityBike Amsterdam (Credit:Jonathan Abarbanel, USA)

Silver Winners
PLUG-IN (Credit:Julia Burke, IDSA, USA)
Terraform (Credit:Robert Moser, USA)
S.I.E.C. Car Seat (Credit:Sam Chiu, Hiro Ikuma, Tim Meyer, and Ai Su, USA)

Bronze Winners
Airwash (Credit:Gabriel Tan and Wendy Chua, Singapore)
E - rope (Credit:Chul Min Kang, Miju Kim, and Sung Hun Lim, USA)
ReFA Disaster Relief Field Bed (Credit:Luisa F. Ruge, USA)

Transportation

Silver Winners
BRP, Sea-Doo, Challenger 180 (Credit:BRP Design Team, Canada)

Bronze Winners
CAMCOPTER S-100 (Credit:, Austria)

Sources
BusinessWeek IDEA06 Showcase

References

External links
Davison Wins Two IDSA Awards

Industrial design awards
Industrial Design Excellence Awards